Detritus is dead or waste organic material.

Detritus may also refer to:
 Detritus (geology), the particles of rock produced by weathering
 Detritus (band), a European thrash metal band
 Detritus the troll, a character in the Discworld series